The following is a list of notable events and releases of the year 1986 in Norwegian music.

Events

March
 21 – The 13th Vossajazz started in Voss, Norway (March 21 – 23).

May
 21 – 14th Nattjazz started in Bergen, Norway (May 21 – June 4).

July
 3 – The 17th Kalvøyafestivalen started at Kalvøya near by Oslo.

Albums released

Unknown date

G
 Jan Garbarek
 Ο Μελισσοκόμος (The Beekeeper) (Minos Records), with Ελένη Καραϊνδρου (Eleni Karaindrou)

J
 Bjørn Johansen Quartet
 Dear Henrik (Gemini Records)

K
 Karin Krog
 Freestyle (Odin Records), with John Surman

Deaths

 March
 22 – Eyvind Hesselberg, organist, composer, and orchestra conductor (born 1898).

 August
 6 – Hans-Jørgen Holman, musicologist and educationalist (born 1925).

October
 22 – Thorgeir Stubø, jazz guitarist, band leader, and composer (born 1943).

November
 23 – Svein Øvergaard, jazz saxophonist and percussionist (born 1912).
 24 – Bias Bernhoft, singer and revue writer (born 1902).

Births

January
 12 – Philip Schjetlein, jazz guitarist.

 February
 12 – Maria Norseth Garli, singer and composer.
 19 – Maria Mena, pop singer.

 March
 19 – Susanne Sundfør, singer and songwriter.

 April
 3 – Thomas Wærnes, rapper.

 July
 11 – Jakop Janssønn Hauan, jazz drummer.

 August
 19 – Vilde Frang, classical violinist.

 September
 1 – Stella Mwangi, singer, songwriter, and rapper.
 15 – William Wiik Larsen, record producer and songwriter.

 October
 10 – Ellen Andrea Wang, jazz upright-bassist and singer.
 12 – Jonas Kilmork Vemøy, jazz trumpeter, and composer.
 13 – Miss Tati, DJ, singer, and songwriter.

 November
 14 – Espen Wensaas, guitarist and multi-instrumentalist.

 Unknown date
 Jon Audun Baar, jazz drummer.
 Emilie Stoesen Christensen, jazz singer and actor.
 Lars Ove Fossheim, jazz guitarist.

See also
 1986 in Norway
 Music of Norway
 Norway in the Eurovision Song Contest 1986

References

 
Norwegian music
Norwegian
Music
1980s in Norwegian music